Sigyn is a goddess and wife of Loki in Norse mythology.

Sigyn may also refer to:
 Sigyn (ship), a wooden barque of 1887, now museum ship in Turku
 MS Sigyn, a ship that transports spent nuclear fuel from Swedish nuclear power plants to Clab
 Sigyn, a genus of parasitic isopods in the family Bopyridae
 Sigyn (Marvel Comics), a fictional character appearing in the Marvel Comics universe
 3631 Sigyn, a main-belt asteroid discovered 1987 by E. W. Elst at La Silla
 Sigyn Glacier, a glacier in Queen Maud Land